Immunotherapy is a peer reviewed medical journal covering immunology and more specifically immunotherapy. It was established in 2009 and is published by Future Medicine. The founding editor-in-chief was Duc Hong Le. The current editors-in-chief are Y. Kawakami, F.M. Marincola, K. Tsang and D.C. Wraith.

Abstracting and indexing 
The journal is abstracted and indexed in:

According to the Journal Citation Reports, the journal has a 2016 impact factor of 2.716, ranking it 90th out of 150 journals in the category "Immunology".

References

External links 

Immunology journals
Publications established in 2008
Future Science Group academic journals
English-language journals
Journals published between 13 and 25 times per year